The Museum of Immigration and Diversity is a British museum at 19 Princelet Street in Spitalfields, in the London Borough of Tower Hamlets. The Grade II listed building in which the museum is located was a house built in 1719 for the Huguenot silk merchant Peter Abraham Ogier.

The house went through a number of stages, the building was converted to a synagogue in 1869. The building remained in use until the 1970s, when the congregation had moved out of the area. It has now been passed to a charity, set up to preserve the building and develop the museum of immigration and diversity.

Due to the fragility of the building, the museum only opens for a few days each year. It has been given £30,000 by English Heritage for repairs and is on the Buildings at Risk Register.

See also
 Rodinsky's Room, about the occupant of a room above the synagogue

Notes

External links
 
 19 Princelet Street website

Immigration to the United Kingdom
Grade II* listed buildings in the London Borough of Tower Hamlets
Grade II* listed houses in London
Houses in the London Borough of Tower Hamlets
History museums in London
Immigration and Diversity
Museums of human migration
Former synagogues in London